The 1961 USAC Championship Car season consisted of 12 races, beginning in Trenton, New Jersey on April 9 and concluding in Phoenix, Arizona on November 19. There was also one non-championship event at Pikes Peak, Colorado.  The USAC National Champion and Indianapolis 500 winner was A. J. Foyt.  The season was marred by the deaths of 1951 and 1958 season champion Tony Bettenhausen at the Indianapolis Motor Speedway and Al Keller at Phoenix.

Schedule and results

 No pole is awarded for the Pikes Peak Hill Climb, in this schedule on the pole is the driver who started first. No lap led was awarded for the Pikes Peak Hill Climb, however, a lap was awarded to the drivers that completed the climb.

Final points standings

References
 
 
 http://media.indycar.com/pdf/2011/IICS_2011_Historical_Record_Book_INT6.pdf  (p. 272-273)

See also
 1961 Indianapolis 500

USAC Championship Car season
USAC Championship Car
1961 in American motorsport